Panagia Pantobasilissa ("Panagia the Queen of All") or Arched Church as it is called in the region is known to be the first church whose walls were decorated with frescoes.

It is indicated in some handwritten scripts that the church was dedicated to Panagia Pantobasillissa. The church is based on a Greek cross plan to in the east and west directions. Although the building is not used currently it has still survived. According to the construction style of its walls, it is believed that the building was constructed at the end of the 13th century. The church has pictures on its walls at different layers and is considered to be very important for Christians. The first layer of frescos were made at the start of the 14th century, the second layer of frescos were made in 1723. It is believed that the columns were brought from Alexandria. There are support pillars at the façades and the public calls the building as the Arched Church. The walls and the dome of the church are in good condition.

Gallery

See also
 Panagia Pantobasilissa church, Rafina

Sources
 

Byzantine church buildings in Turkey
Buildings and structures in Bursa Province
Byzantine Bithynia